John Steinbreder is an American writer. He has written or co-written 22 books, of which 17 have been about golf. He is also a contributor to Masters.com, the official website for the Masters Tournament, and a senior writer for Global Golf Post, the digital weekly magazine. In addition, he serves as the travel and golf course architecture editor at the Post and the managing editor of its business platform, GGPBiz. Steinbreder has reported on the game on five continents and received 14 honors for his work from the Golf Writers Association of America and 37 from the International Network of Golf.

Education and career

Steinbreder graduated from Franklin University in Lugano, Switzerland with an Associate of Arts degree in 1976 and then attended the University of Nairobi in 1977. In 1979, he received a B.A. in Journalism from the University of Oregon. He worked as a reporter for Fortune magazine from 1983 to 1988 and then moved to Sports Illustrated, where served as a writer and reporter from 1988 to 1991 and after that a special contributor from 1991 to 1994. Steinbreder then joined the staff of Golfweek in 1999, as a senior writer, and was employed there until 2008. A year later, he helped found Global Golf Post.

Major works
 Giants - 70 Years of Championship Football
 A History of the City of New Haven
 Golf Courses of the U.S. Open, by John Steinbreder, Taylor Publishing Co., Dallas, 1996, . Pictorial history of golf clubs which have hosted the U.S. Open, the premier American golf championship.
 Fighting for Your Children: A Father's Guide to Custody, by John Steinbreder and Richard G. Kent, Taylor Publishing Co., Dallas, 1998, .
 Giants: 75 Seasons of Championship Football, second edition, by John Steinbreder, Taylor Publishing Co., Dallas, 1999, . History of the National Football League's New York Giants.
 Hockey for Dummies, by John Davidson and John Steinbreder, John Wiley & Sons, Inc., New York, .
 Golf Rules and Etiquette for Dummies, by John Steinbreder, For Dummies, 2001, .
 Club Life: The Games Golfers Play, by John Steinbreder, Taylor Publishing Co., Dallas, 2006, .
 Solomon's Choice: A Guide to Custody for Ex-husbands, Spurned Partners, And Forgotten Grandparents, by John Steinbreder and Richard G. Kent, Taylor Publishing Co., Dallas, 2006, .
 A Place of Merit - A History of the Merit Club
 Golf Kohler - In The New and Old Worlds
 The Travis Invitational - 100 Years
 The Three-Degree Putting Solution (with Michael Breed)
 The Secrets to Owning Your Swing (with Ed Tischler)
 The History of the Metedeconk National Golf Club 
 18 Ways to Play a Better 18 Holes
 The History of the Society of Seniors
 A History of the Yale Club of New York City
 From Turnberry To Tasmania - Adventures of a Traveling Golfer
 A Centennial History of the PGA of America (editor)
 A History of the Princess Anne Country Club

Notes

American non-fiction writers
Golf writers and broadcasters
American sportswriters
Living people
Writers from Connecticut
University of Nairobi alumni
University of Oregon alumni
Franklin University alumni
1956 births